Richard Edward Pain (born 21 September 1956) is a retired Anglican bishop. From 2013 to 2019, he served as Bishop of Monmouth in the Church in Wales.

Early life
Pain was born on 21 September 1956. He completed degrees at Bristol University and Cardiff University. He trained for ordination at St Michael's College, Llandaff.

Ordained ministry
Pain served his curacy in Caldicot, Monmouthshire. He was then Curate in Charge then vicar of Cwmtillery and Six Bells before moving to Risca, and finally to Monmouth. He served as Archdeacon of Monmouth from 2008 to 2013.

Episcopal ministry
He was elected Bishop of Monmouth on 23 July 2013. Having accepted the position, he was consecrated on 21 September at Llandaff Cathedral and enthroned at Newport Cathedral on 18 October. He was the 10th Bishop of Monmouth.

In January 2019, the South Wales Argus revealed that Pain had not performed any of his episcopal duties since July 2018. He was undergoing a "formal process of mediation": this was due to a "personality clash between the bishop and some of his staff", rather than relating to a serious or criminal matter.

Pain retired on 30 April 2019, due to ill health.

Personal life
Pain is married. He and his wife have had three children together, one of whom died in 2008 from an accidental overdose of prescription drugs.

References

External links
 Bishop Richard's Biography

1956 births
Alumni of the University of Bristol
Bishops of Monmouth
Living people
Alumni of Cardiff University
Alumni of St Michael's College, Llandaff
Archdeacons of Monmouth